Lawrence Terry, Jr. (born April 12, 1946) is an American rower who competed in the 1968 Summer Olympics and in the 1972 Summer Olympics.

He was born in Concord, Massachusetts.

In 1968 he was a crew member of the American boat which finished fifth in the coxless four event.

Four years later he won the silver medal as strokeman of the American boat in the 1972 eight competition.

He graduated from Middlesex School and Harvard University.

References

External links
 

1946 births
Living people
American male rowers
Rowers at the 1968 Summer Olympics
Rowers at the 1972 Summer Olympics
Olympic silver medalists for the United States in rowing
Medalists at the 1972 Summer Olympics
Harvard Crimson rowers